An epitaph is an inscription honoring a deceased person, usually on a tombstone or plaque.

Epitaph may also refer to:

Film
 Epitaph (2007 film), a 2007 South Korean film
 Epitaph (2015 film), a 2015 Mexican film

Publishing
 The Tombstone Epitaph, a former newspaper and current magazine published in Tombstone, Arizona

Music
 Epitaph Records, an American record label
 Epitaph (band), a German rock band

Classical
Epitaph, composition by Hans Werner Henze
 The Epitaph, Надгробное письмо 1894 song by Mussorgsky
"Epitaph", song by Phyllis Tate (1911-1985)
"An Epitaph", song by Ivor Gurney

Albums
 Epitaph World Tour, a 2011 farewell tour by Judas Priest
 Epitaph (video), video of said tour
 Epitaph (Charles Mingus composition)
 Epitaph (King Crimson album)
 Epitaph (Front Line Assembly album)
 Epitaph (Necrophagist album)

Songs
"Epitaph" (King Crimson song), a song by King Crimson from their 1969 album In the Court of the Crimson King
"Epitaph", a song by Trees from their 1970 album The Garden of Jane Delawney
"Epitaph (Black and Blue)", a song by Kris Kristofferson from his 1971 album The Silver Tongued Devil and I
 "Epitaph", a song by Camel from their 1975 album The Snow Goose
"Epitaph", a song by Judas Priest from their 1976 album Sad Wings of Destiny
"Epitaph", a 1981 single by The Wall
 "Epitaph", a song by Badly Drawn Boy from his 2000 album The Hour of Bewilderbeast
 "Epitáfio", a song by Brazilian rock band Titãs from 2002 album A Melhor Banda de Todos os Tempos da Última Semana
 "Epitaph", a song by Hey Rosetta! from their 2006 album Plan Your Escape
 "Epitaph", a song by Hippo Campus from their 2017 album Landmark

See also
 Epitafios, an Argentine TV series
 Epitaphios (disambiguation)